The Mystery of the Cape Cod Tavern, first published in 1934, is a detective story by Phoebe Atwood Taylor which features her series detective Asey Mayo, the "Codfish Sherlock".  This novel is a mystery of the type known as a whodunnit.

Plot summary

Eve Prence is the glamorous and publicity-seeking owner of the famous Cape Cod Tavern, and uses her publicity to keep the Tavern filled with famous and/or wealthy guests.  She has a house-full the night she's found at the bottom of the grand staircase, claiming somebody had tried to kill her. The following day, she is found with a knife in her ribs.  Asey Mayo must work out the meaning of clues like a pair of antique pistols that contain a pair of antique daggers, and what exactly the blind boy on the scene of the crime heard, and a pair of dirty indentations on a windowsill before bringing home the crime to a surprising figure.

1934 American novels
Novels by Phoebe Atwood Taylor
Novels set on Cape Cod and the Islands
W. W. Norton & Company books